Mahmoud Ibrahim Ibrahim El Khatib (born 30 October 1954), popularly nicknamed Bibo, is an Egyptian retired footballer and current President of Al Ahly. He is widely regarded as one of the best players in African football history.

Education
Cooperation Institute
(معهد التعاون)

Career
Born in Qarqirah, Dakahlia, El Khatib played his entire career at Al Ahly, where he won ten Egyptian Premier Leagues, five Egypt Cups, two African Cup of Champions and three African Cup Winners' Cup. In addition, he won the 1986 Africa Cup of Nations with Egypt.

In 2004, he became the vice-president of Al Ahly, before being elected as president in 2017.

Honours and achievements

Club
Al Ahly
 Egyptian Premier League: 1974–75, 1975–76, 1976–77, 1978–79, 1979–80, 1980–81, 1981–82, 1984–85, 1985–86, 1986–87
 Egypt Cup: 1978, 1981, 1983, 1984, 1985
 African Cup of Champions Clubs: 1982, 1987
 African Cup Winners' Cup: 1984, 1985, 1986

International
Egypt 
 African Cup of Nations: 1986

Individual

Awards
 Africa Cup of Nations Dream Team: 1980
 African Footballer of the Year: 1983
 CAF Awards: 2004
 IFFHS Legends: 2016

Performances
 Egyptian Premier League top goalscorer: 1977–78, 1980–81
 African Cup of Champions Clubs top goalscorer: 1982, 1983, 1987

References

External links 

 Download Bibo's Goals with Al-Ahly.
 Bibo's Fans site: Goals, Photos and Songs.
 Download Bibo's goal against Bayern Munich in a friendly match
 BEBO

1954 births
Living people
Egyptian footballers
Egypt international footballers
Al Ahly SC players
Footballers at the 1984 Summer Olympics
Olympic footballers of Egypt
People from Dakahlia Governorate
1976 African Cup of Nations players
1980 African Cup of Nations players
1984 African Cup of Nations players
1986 African Cup of Nations players
African Footballer of the Year winners
Africa Cup of Nations-winning players
Association football forwards
Egyptian Premier League players